{{Speciesbox
| image = Juniperus conferta.JPG
| parent = Juniperus sect. Juniperus
| genus = Juniperus
| species = conferta| authority = Parl.
}}Juniperus conferta (shore juniper and blue pacific juniper) is a species of juniper, native to Japan, where it grows on sand dunes. It is often treated as a variety or subspecies of Juniperus rigida''.

Description
It forms a cover with a fresh yellowish-green color reminiscent of lawn. The foliage is prickly, typical of many junipers. The plant can tolerate acidic and alkaline soils but requires good drainage. Like other junipers it is tolerant of herbicides such as glyphosate.

Etymology
Conferta is derived from Latin. "Con" meaning together and "ferta" meaning strong.

Uses
It is also often grown as bonsai.

References

External links

Shore Juniper Bonsai at Ausbonsai

conferta
Flora of Japan